Bromus japonicus, the Japanese brome, is an annual brome grass native to Eurasia. The grass has a diploid number of 14.

Description

The culms are erect or ascending. The sheaths of the grass are pubescent, though upper sheaths are occasionally glabrous. The open and secund panicles have divergent branches with drooping tips. The divergent branches are typically longer than the purplish spikelets and are ascending or spreading. The six to twelve florets on each spikelet have concealed bases at maturity. The glumes are either smooth or scabrous. The palea is distinctly shorter that its glume. The caryopses are slightly shorter than the paleas, and are thin, flat, and slightly rolled inwards.

The grass flowers from June to August.

Habitat and distribution

Bromus japonicus grows in fields, waste places, road verges, sand dunes, and other similar places. It is a troublesome weed in grain fields and is a noxious weed in prairies, as it competes with native perennials for water and nutrients. It is intolerant of alkaline soils.

The grass is native to Eurasia but has been naturalized throughout the United States and southern Canada and is rare in the Yukon.

References

japonicus